The Evangelical Lutheran Church in Northern Germany (Evangelisch-Lutherische Kirche in Norddeutschland) is a Lutheran member church of the Evangelical Church in Germany (Evangelische Kirche in Deutschland, EKD). It was established on 27 May 2012 as a merger of the North Elbian Evangelical Lutheran Church, the Evangelical Lutheran Church of Mecklenburg, and the Pomeranian Evangelical Church. It covers the combined area of all those former member churches, which are the federal states of Schleswig-Holstein, Hamburg and Mecklenburg-Vorpommern. Nordkirche is the only Landeskirche in Germany which covers parts of both New states of Germany and West Germany. It is also called Nordkirche (North Church). It has 1,892,749 members (31/12/2020). There are 1,704 ordained pastors and more than 84,000 volunteers working for Nordkirche (4/2016).

Landesbischof
The Landesbischof (Presiding Bishop) is the senior (metropolitan) bishop and principal leader of the Nordkirche. In German, Nordkirche uses the title Landesbischof (literally: State Bishop). He or she got his or her see in Schwerin Cathedral but preaches in both, Schwerin Cathedral and Lübeck Cathedral. He or she is the leader and primus inter pares of the bishops in the dioceses (Sprengel). He or she chairs the Council of Bishops (Bischofsrat) and the Church Executive Board (Kirchenleitung).

First Landesbischof Gerhard Ulrich also served as  Leitender Bischof (Leading Bishop) of United Evangelical Lutheran Church of Germany from 2011 until 2018. Ulrich was retired as Presiding Bishop 31 March 2019.  On 27 September 2018, the General Synod elected regional bishop (Regionalbischöfin) Kristina Kühnbaum-Schmidt as new Presiding Bishop (Landesbischöfin). She started to serve as new Presiding Bishop 1 April 2019; Gerhard Ulrich gave back his pectoral cross 9 March 2019 and was retired 31 March 2019.

Dioceses
There are three dioceses (German: Sprengel). They consist of total 13 districts (German: Kirchenkreise). Each diocese is led by a bishop in the diocese (German:Bischof im Sprengel).

Sprengel Schleswig und Holstein (Diocese of Schleswig and Holstein) covers the state of Schleswig-Holstein without some parts of Southern Holstein (larger urban zone of Hamburg), Lübeck and the Duchy of Lauenburg. The parishes in Nordschleswig (Danish: Nordslesvig) in Southern Denmark (Jutland) also belong to the Diocese of Schleswig and Holstein. Current bishop is Gothard Magaard. He got his see in Schleswig Cathedral.
 Kirchenkreis Altholstein
 Kirchenkreis Dithmarschen
 Kirchenkreis Nordfriesland 
 Kirchenkreis Ostholstein
 Kirchenkreis Plön-Segeberg 
 Kirchenkreis Rantzau-Münsterdorf
 Kirchenkreis Rendsburg-Eckernförde 
 Kirchenkreis Schleswig-Flensburg 
 Parishes of German speaking minority in Southern Jutland (South of Denmark).

Sprengel Hamburg und Lübeck (Diocese of Hamburg and Lübeck) covers the cities of Hamburg and Lübeck, some parts of Southern Holstein and the Duchy of Lauenburg. Current bishop is Kirsten Fehrs. She got her see in St. Michael's Church, Hamburg.
 Kirchenkreis Hamburg-Ost
 Kirchenkreis Hamburg-West/Südholstein
 Kirchenkreis Lübeck-Lauenburg

Sprengel Mecklenburg und Pommern (Diocese of Mecklenburg and Pommern) covers the state of Mecklenburg-Vorpommern. There have been two bishop because of the latest merger of Nordkirche until spring of 2019: Dr Andreas von Malzahn (Schwerin) and Dr Hans-Jürgen Abromeit (Greifswald). Current bishop is Tilman Jeremias. He has his see in St. Nikolai, Greifswald.
 Kirchenkreis Mecklenburg 
 Kirchenkreis Pommern

List of bishops
Presiding Bishop (Landesbischof resp. Landesbischöfin)
 2012-2019: Gerhard Ulrich
 since 2019: Kristina Kühnbaum-Schmidt

Bishop in the Diocese of Schleswig and Holstein
 since 2012: Gothard Magaard

Bishop in the Diocese of Hamburg and Lübeck
 since 2012: Kirsten Fehrs

Bishop in the Diocese of Mecklenburg and Pommern
 2012-2019: Dr Andreas von Maltzahn (based in Schwerin)
 2012-2019: Dr Hans-Jürgen Abromeit (based in Greifswald)
 Since 2019: Tilman Jeremias

Organisation
The Sprengel of Mecklenburg und Pommern got two bishops because of the latest merger of the former regional churches of Mecklenburg and Pommern with Nordelbien. After a period of transition there will only be one bishop for the Sprengel (spring 2019).
The headquarters (Landeskirchenamt) are in Kiel and in Schwerin. Each Sprengel is structured into many districts ("Kirchenkreise"); there are 13 districts. The Kirchenkreis is the unit of some parishes.

Instruments of organisation are:
 Landessynode (general synod; literally: State Synod); praeses: Ulrike Hillmann. The synod consists of both, clergy and lay people. The Landessynode regularly meets in Lübeck.
The synod is led by the praeses.
 2012-2018: Dr Andreas Tietze
 since 2018: Ulrike Hillmann

 Landeskirchenamt (church administrative office); president: Prof Dr Peter Unruh. The Landeskirchenamt is based in Kiel and in Schwerin.
 Bischofsrat (bishops' council). The Bischofsrat consist of all bishops of Nordkirche. The chair is the Presiding Bishop.
 Kirchenleitung (church executive board). The Kirchenleitung consists of all bishops and of representatives of clergy, lay people and staff. The chair is the Presiding Bishop.

Ecumenism
The Centre for Global Ministries and Ecumenical Relations (Zentrum für Mission und Ökumene, ZMÖ) is based in Breklum, North Frisia (head office) and in Hamburg (staffed office). It cares about all international and ecumenical relationships of Nordkirche. It has its roots in Breklum's missionary society, founded in 1876 by pastor Christian Jensen. They prepared and sent missionaries to India and to the US, then also to Tanzania, China and Papua-Neuguinea.

Diaconia
There are three Diakonische Werke (Protestant relief, development and social service organisations) in each federal state:
 Diakonisches Werk Schleswig-Holstein (HQ in Rendsburg). Total number of staff: 28,000.
 Diakonisches Werk Hamburg (HQ in Hamburg). Total number of staff: 18,000.
 Diakonisches Werk Mecklenburg-Vorpommern (HQ in Schwerin). Total number of staff: 11,000.
All three Diakonische Werke are member of Diakonie Deutschland, which is the umbrella organisation of all federal Diakonische Werke. Each federal Diakonisches Werk is led by a Landespastor (State Pastor).

Practices and life of the church
Ordination of women and blessing of same-sex marriages were allowed. Maria Jepsen was the first woman worldwide who became female bishop. She served as bishop of the former diocese (Sprengel) of Hamburg from 1992-2010.

Academics
Universities

Nordkirche doesn't run any university, but there are four state faculties of theology in the area of Nordkirche:
 Kiel, in the State of Schleswig-Holstein
 Hamburg, in the City and State of Hamburg
 Rostock, in the State of Mecklenburg-Vorpommern
 Greifswald, in the State of Mecklenburg-Vorpommern
The relations between universities, faculties, federal states and Nordkirche are written down in Contracts between States and Church. Students of theology finish their studies with 1. Kirchliches Examen.

Predigerseminar

Predigerseminar (literally: preachers' seminary) is based in the old Ratzeburg Cathedral and Monastery. Vicars (a vicar is a pastor in training) are educated there between university studies and ordination. A vicar (German: Vikar) is a candidate for ordained pastoral ministry, serving in a Vikariat (internship) Vikariat dures 2.5 years. Vicars are trained in three places: Predigerseminar in Ratzeburg, parish and school. Vikariat is the practical part of education after theoretical studies at university. Vicars finish their education with 2. Kirchliches Examen.

References

External links
  

North
Northern Germany
North
Northern Germany
Northern Germany